The list of ship commissionings in 1905 includes a chronological list of all ships commissioned in 1905.


See also 

1905
 Ship commissionings